The Men's shot put event  at the 2007 European Athletics Indoor Championships was held on March 2.

Medalists

Results

Qualification
Qualifying perf. 20.00 (Q) or 8 best performers (q) advanced to the Final.

Final

References
Results

Shot put at the European Athletics Indoor Championships
Shot